Dioryctria is a genus of snout moths. It was described by Philipp Christoph Zeller in 1846.

Species

 Dioryctria abietella (Denis & Schiffermüller, 1775)
 Dioryctria abietivorella (Grote, 1878)
 Dioryctria adamsi Neunzig & Dow, 1993
 Dioryctria albovittella (Hulst, 1900)
 Dioryctria amatella (Hulst, 1887)
 Dioryctria assamensis Mutuura, 1971
 Dioryctria aulloi Barbey, 1930
 Dioryctria auranticella (Grote, 1883)
 Dioryctria banksiella Mutuura, Munroe & Ross, 1969
 Dioryctria batesella Mutuura & Neunzig, 1986
 Dioryctria baumhoferi Heinrich, 1956
 Dioryctria caesirufella Blanchard & Knudson, 1983
 Dioryctria cambiicola (Dyar, 1914)
 Dioryctria castanea Bradley, 1969
 Dioryctria cibriani Mutuura & Neunzig, 1986
 Dioryctria clarioralis (Walker, 1863)
 Dioryctria contortella Mutuura, Munroe & Ross, 1969
 Dioryctria cuitecensis Neunzig, 1990
 Dioryctria delectella (Hulst, 1895)
 Dioryctria disclusa Heinrich, 1953
 Dioryctria dominguensis Neunzig, 1996
 Dioryctria durangoensis Mutuura & Neunzig, 1986
 Dioryctria ebeli Mutuura & Munroe, 1979
 Dioryctria erythropasa (Dyar, 1914)
 Dioryctria fanjingshana Li in Kuang & Li, 2009
 Dioryctria fordi Donahue & Neunzig, 2002
 Dioryctria gulosella (Hulst, 1890)
 Dioryctria hodgesi Neunzig, 2003
 Dioryctria horneana (Dyar, 1919)
 Dioryctria inyoensis Neunzig, 2003
 Dioryctria juniperella Yamanaka, 1990
 Dioryctria kunmingella Wang & Sung, 1985
 Dioryctria magnifica Munroe, 1958
 Dioryctria majorella Dyar, 1919
 Dioryctria martini Mutuura & Neunzig, 1986
 Dioryctria mendacella (Staudinger, 1859)
 Dioryctria merkeli Mutuura & Munroe, 1979
 Dioryctria mongolicella Wang & Sung, 1982
 Dioryctria monticolella Mutuura, Munroe & Ross, 1969
 Dioryctria muricativorella Neunzig, 2003
 Dioryctria mutuurai Neunzig, 2003
 Dioryctria nivaliensis Rebel, 1892
 Dioryctria okanaganella Mutuura, Munroe & Ross, 1969
 Dioryctria okui Mutuura, 1958
 Dioryctria peltieri de Joannis, 1908
 Dioryctria pentictonella Mutuura, Munroe & Ross, 1969
 Dioryctria peyerimhoffi de Joannis, 1921
 Dioryctria pineae (Staudinger, 1859)
 Dioryctria pinicolella Amsel, 1962
 Dioryctria ponderosae Dyar, 1914
 Dioryctria postmajorella Freyer, 1996
 Dioryctria pryeri Ragonot, 1893
 Dioryctria pseudotsugella Munroe, 1959
 Dioryctria pygmaeella Ragonot, 1887
 Dioryctria raoi Mutuura, 1971
 Dioryctria reniculelloides Mutuura & Munroe, 1973
 Dioryctria resiniphila Segerer & Pröse, 1997
 Dioryctria resinosella Mutuura, 1982
 Dioryctria robiniella (Millière, 1865)
 Dioryctria rossi Munroe, 1959
 Dioryctria rubella Hampson in Ragonot, 1901
 Dioryctria schuetzeella Fuchs, 1899
 Dioryctria sierra Neunzig, 2003
 Dioryctria simplicella Heinemann, 1863
 Dioryctria stenopterella Amsel, 1960
 Dioryctria subtracta Heinrich, 1956
 Dioryctria sylvestrella (Ratzeburg, 1840)
 Dioryctria symphoniella Hampson, 1899
 Dioryctria sysstratiotes Dyar, 1919
 Dioryctria taedae Schaber & Wood, 1971
 Dioryctria taedivorella Neunzig & Leidy, 1989
 Dioryctria taiella Amsel, 1970
 Dioryctria tumicolella Mutuura, Munroe & Ross, 1969
 Dioryctria vancouverella Mutuura, Munroe & Ross, 1969
 Dioryctria westerlandi Donahue & Neunzig, 2002
 Dioryctria yatesi Mutuura & Munroe, 1979
 Dioryctria yiai Mutuura & Munroe, 1972
 Dioryctria yuennanella Caradja in Caradja & Meyrick, 1937
 Dioryctria zimmermanni (Grote, 1877)

Former species
 Dioryctria actualis is now Catastia actualis (Hulst, 1886)

References

 
Phycitini
Pyralidae genera
Taxa named by Philipp Christoph Zeller